Rhinolekos schaeferi is a species of catfish in the family Loricariidae. It is native to South America, where it occurs in the Paranaíba River basin in the upper Paraná River system in the state of Goiás in Brazil. The species reaches 3.8 cm (1.5 inches) in standard length. Its specific name, schaeferi, honors Scott A. Schaefer of the American Museum of Natural History for his contributions to the systematics of the subfamily Hypoptopomatinae.

References 

Loricariidae
Fish described in 2011
Catfish of South America
Freshwater fish of Brazil